Tombet or tumbet is a traditional vegetable dish from Majorca, consisting of layers of sliced potatoes, aubergines and red bell peppers previously fried in olive oil. It is available at almost every local restaurant on the island.

Tombet is often served along with fish or meat, but on its own it makes a good vegetarian dish.

Preparation
The aubergines and red peppers should not be peeled.
The whole is topped with tomato fried with garlic and parsley and presented in a way that it looks like a pie without a crust.

Tombet is the Majorcan version of the Occitan ratatouille or the Catalan samfaina. Influenced by those dishes, nowadays some people add zucchini to the mixture, but this is a vegetable that is not present in the original dish.

See also
Ratatouille
Balearic cuisine
Catalan cuisine
 List of stews
Spanish cuisine
Valencian cuisine

References

Eggplant dishes
Potato dishes
Vegetarian cuisine
Balearic cuisine
Spanish soups and stews
Catalan cuisine
National dishes